The Ksp 58 (Swedish: Kulspruta 58) is a Swedish variant of the Belgian FN MAG general purpose machine gun that is currently being manufactured by the Swedish company Carl Gustafs Stads Gevärsfaktori and was adopted by the Swedish Armed Forces in 1958.

History
After 1945, many countries were trying to produce their own machine guns based on the MG 42 design. In the early 1950s, Belgian arms manufacturer FN Herstal succeeded in developing a general-purpose machine gun called the MAG. The initial Ksp 58A version used by Sweden was chambered for 6.5×55mm, while the B and later models were chambered for 7.62×51mm NATO.

Users
: Used by the Swedish Armed Forces since 1958 to the present.

 : Ksp 58B version in use. Was first received from Sweden in 1990's as military aid.

 : Ksp 58B version in use. Was first received from Sweden in 1990's as military aid.

 : Ksp 58B version in use. Was first received from Sweden in 1990's as military aid.

 :Ksp 58B version in use. Received as military aid

References

Machine guns of Sweden